Houliston Glacier is a tributary glacier between Neall Massif and the West Quartzite Range, Victoria Land, Antarctica, flowing northwest into Black Glacier. It was so named by the New Zealand Geological Survey Antarctic Expedition, 1967–68, for R. Houliston, an electrician at Scott Base, 1967–68. This glacier lies situated on the Pennell Coast, a portion of Antarctica lying between Cape Williams and Cape Adare.

References

Glaciers of Pennell Coast